Burger M. Engebretson (June 21, 1896 -  18 January 1981) was a member of the Wisconsin State Assembly.

Biography
Burger M. Engebretson was born in Oslo, Norway. He served in the United States Army during World War I. He later attended the University of Wisconsin-Madison. He was engaged in the insurance and real estate business in Beloit, Wisconsin. He died in 1981 at age 84. He was buried at Eastlawn Cemetery in Beloit, Wisconsin.

Political career
Engebretson served two terms in the Rock County, Wisconsin Board of Supervisors. Engebretson served as a Republican Representative in the Wisconsin State Assembly. He  represented Rock County's 2nd District from 1937-54.

References

Norwegian emigrants to the United States
Politicians from Beloit, Wisconsin
County supervisors in Wisconsin
Republican Party members of the Wisconsin State Assembly
Military personnel from Wisconsin
United States Army personnel of World War I
University of Wisconsin–Madison alumni
1896 births
1981 deaths